On Wenlock Edge is a song cycle composed in 1909 by Ralph Vaughan Williams for tenor, piano and string quartet. The cycle comprises settings of six poems from A. E. Housman's 1896 collection A Shropshire Lad. A typical performance lasts around 22 minutes. It was premiered by Gervase Elwes, Frederick Kiddle and the Schwiller Quartet on 15 November 1909 in the Aeolian Hall, London. It was later orchestrated by the composer in a version first performed on 24 January 1924.
Subsequent editions show a measure excised from the final movement (Clun): the third measure from the end. The Boosey and Hawkes 1946 score notes indicates this in a footnote on the last page. 
The cycle was recorded by Elwes, Kiddle and the London String Quartet in 1917.

The Roman numerals in this list of the songs are taken from A Shropshire Lad:

 XXXI "On Wenlock Edge"
 XXXII "From Far, from Eve and Morning"
 XXVII "Is My Team Ploughing"
 XVIII "Oh, When I Was in Love with You"
 XXI "Bredon Hill" (first line: "In summertime on Bredon")
 L "Clun" (Housman's title, and the first line: "Clunton and Clunbury")

An earlier version of "Is My Team Ploughing?", for voice and piano, had been performed on 26 January 1909 in a concert sponsored by Gervase Elwes and James Friskin.

To Housman's annoyance, Vaughan Williams omitted the third and fourth verses of "Is My Team Ploughing". The composer remarked in 1927 or later that he felt “that the composer has a perfect right artistically to set any portion of a poem he chooses provided he does not actually alter the sense”.

References

Further reading
Evans, Edwin (June 1, 1918). "English Song and 'On Wenlock Edge.'" The Musical Times, vol. 59, no. 904, pp. 247–249. 
LaRue, Jan (1967). "A Legacy from Vaughan Williams: Authentic Tempi for On Wenlock Edge." The Music Review, vol. 28, pp. 147–148.

External links

Song cycles by Ralph Vaughan Williams
1909 compositions
Songs based on poems
Classical song cycles in English
Musical settings of poems by A. E. Housman